Andre Rosey Brown (February 7, 1956 – July 18, 2006) was an American film and television actor, police officer and football coach.

Life and career 
Brown was born in Rockford, Illinois. Before becoming an actor, he was a police officer for the Inglewood Police Department. He had attended the University of Montana, where he played football and supported himself by working as a jazz drummer. He then worked in law enforcement in Seattle and Los Angeles.

Brown began his television career in 1985, appearing in the police procedural television series Hill Street Blues, playing a wrestler. He began his film career in the television film The Return of Mickey Spillane's Mike Hammer, where he got a call for the role of the tough-guy "Big Black Man", in 1986.

In 1998, Brown retired from being a police officer for the Inglewood Police Department, where he served for 14 years. After retiring, he continued his film and television career.

In the 1990s and 2000s, Brown appeared and guest-starred in numerous film and television programs including Designing Women, Caddyshack II, Throw Momma from the Train, Night Court, The Golden Girls, What's Happening Now!!, Canadian Bacon, Full House, The Fresh Prince of Bel-Air, Frasier, Meet Wally Sparks, Dave's World, The Drew Carey Show, Friends, Back in Business, Matlock, Off the Mark, Class Act, Daddy Dearest, Barb Wire, Car 54, Where Are You?, Step By Step, Naked Gun : The Final Insult, ER, The Wayans Bros., Catfish in Black Bean Sauce, Money Talks, The Jamie Foxx Show, Martin, Pros & Cons, Big Fat Liar, Space Jam and Forget Paris. He also played the main role of "Morgan Washington" in the crime drama television series 413 Hope St., appearing in eight episodes.

Brown retired from his acting career in 2002, last appearing in the film Devious Beings.

Death 
In July 2006, Brown died of a short illness in Northridge, California, at the age of 50.

Filmography

Film

Television

References

External links 

Rotten Tomatoes profile

1956 births
2006 deaths
People from Rockford, Illinois
Male actors from Illinois
Actors from Rockford, Illinois
American male film actors
American male television actors
20th-century American male actors
21st-century American male actors
American police officers
20th-century African-American people
21st-century African-American people